General elections were held in Guam on November 6, 1984 to elect the Legislature, the islands' delegate to the United States House of Representatives, Commissioners, Assistant Commissioners and the Territorial School Board. Voters also voted on three referendum questions. Primary elections had been held on September 1, 1984.

Results

Legislature

Delegate

Referendums
Three proposals were put to voters:
Proposal A – an amendment to Title 12 of the Guam Code to limit the amount that the Guam Power Authority could raise prices by, as well as changing how prices increased and to reduce prices back to those of 1 February 1983.
Proposal B – an amendment to Title 2 of the Guam Code to limit annual expenditure of the Legislature to £3m, reduce Senators salaries to $18,000 and the Speaker's salary to $19,500, make people personally responsible if they are responsible for breaking the cap and to reduce the number of sessions to 90 days during a two-year term.
Proposal C – an amendment to Title 2 of the Government Code limiting gubernatorial spending to 95% of the actual government spend two years previously and diverting remaining government funds to the general fund and Guam Retired Fund deficits and liabilities.

References

1984 in Guam
1984
1984
1984 elections in Oceania
1984 referendums
1984
1984 United States House of Representatives elections